Parole de flic is a 1985 French crime film directed by José Pinheiro and produced by and starring Alain Delon. It marked Delon's return to action films after a period devoted to more intimate films.

Ne réveillez pas un flic qui dort (1988) was the sequel to this film.

Plot
Daniel Pratt (Alain Delon) is a former police officer living on an African island. When he learns that his daughter has been murdered in Lyon, he returns to France to avenge her, and brutally kills the perpetrators one by one.

Cast
 Alain Delon: Daniel Pratt
 Jacques Perrin: Stéphane Reiner
 Fiona Gélin: Sabine Clément
 Éva Darlan: Dominique Reiner
 Jean-François Stévenin: Sylvain Dubor
 Stéphane Ferrara: Abel Salem
 Vincent Lindon: Dax
 Dominique Valera: Brice
 : Remy

Production
Philippe Setbon was the initial scriptwriter, but left the project before completion; the final script was written by Frédéric H. Fajardie and edited by Pinheiro and Delon. Shooting took place in and around Lyons, and in the People's Republic of Congo for African scenes.

The song "I Don't Know", played over the closing credits, is sung by Alain Delon and Phyllis Nelson.

Stéphane Ferrara, who had previously appeared in Jean-Luc Godard's Détective, was a French national champion in boxing.

Release
Parole de flic was released in France on 21 August 1985. The film was also released as Cop's Honour in the United Kingdom in 1987, and as Hot Gun in the Philippines on 22 May 1987.

Reception
Parole de flic was a big hit in France, with admissions of 2,517,875.

References

External links

1980s crime action films
1985 films
French crime action films
Films produced by Alain Delon
French films about revenge
Films directed by José Pinheiro
1980s French films